The Men's 20,000m Walk event at the 2010 South American Games was held on March 21 at 8:00.

Medalists

Records

Results
Results were published.

Intermediate times:

See also
2010 South American Under-23 Championships in Athletics

References

External links
Report

Walk M